Mangalam is a panchayat village in Villianur Commune in the Union Territory of Puducherry, India.

Geography
Mangalam is bordered by Vadamangalam in the west, Sangarabarani River in the north,  Uruvayaru in the east and Sembiapalayam village in the south.

Transport
Sembiampalayam is located at 11 km from Pondicherry. Mangalam can be reached directly by any bus running between Pondicherry and Maducarai (Madukarai).

Road Network
Mangalam is connected to Pondicherry by Mangalam - Maducarai State Highway (RC-19)

Politics
Mangalam is a part of Mangalam (Union Territory Assembly constituency) which comes under Puducherry (Lok Sabha constituency). A newly created Assembly constituency, the first election was held in 2011.

Places

 Mangalam Police Station
 Government Higher Secondary School
 Mariyamman Temple

References

External links
 Official website of the Government of the Union Territory of Puducherry

Villages in Puducherry district